Jindřich Bačkovský (May 4, 1912 – 2000) was an eminent Czechoslovak physicist whose work focused on X-ray spectroscopy, the structure of crystals, vacuum techniques, radiometry and the physics of high pressures. Many of his findings are used in industry, especially in the manufacture of semiconductor parts and synthetic diamonds.

External links
Czech archives
Short Biography (Czech)

Czechoslovak physicists
1912 births
2000 deaths